Old maid's pink is a common name for several plants and may refer to:

Agrostemma
Saponaria officinalis